Giruá is a municipality in the northern part of the state of Rio Grande do Sul, Brazil. The population is 15,863 (2020 est.) in an area of 855.92 km². It is located 474 km west of the state capital of Porto Alegre, northeast of Alegrete.

Bounding municipalities

Santa Rosa
Três de Maio
Independência
Catuípe
Santo Ângelo
Sete de Setembro
Senador Salgado Filho

Economy

Because of its rich volcanic soil, agriculture is important in Giruá, notably soy production. Its nickname is the Capital of Productivity. Other important crops are maize, wheat, sunflower and linseed.

History

The area of Giruá was first inhabited by the Guarani people, and in the 17th century Jesuit missions arrived. The name Giruá comes from jerivá, an indigenous word for the fruit of the butia palm.

References

External links
http://www.citybrazil.com.br/rs/girua/ 

Municipalities in Rio Grande do Sul